Águas Santas e Moure (officially, União das Freguesias de Águas Santas e Moure) is a Portuguese Freguesia in the Municipality of Póvoa de Lanhoso, it has an area of 3.89 km2 and 662 inahbitants (2011).

It was created during the administrative reorganization of 2012/2013, from the aggregation of the former parishes of Águas Santas and Moure.

References 

Freguesias of Póvoa de Lanhoso
Freguesias of Portugal